Vibeke Windeløv (born 22 December 1950) is a Danish film producer. She founded Refugees United in 2008 and served on numerous corporate boards, film festival juries and association committees. She produced the films of Lars von Trier for ten years.

She served on the board of the European Film Academy 1998–2004, on the Jury of the Venice Film Festival 2001, the Montreal Film Festival 2006, Sundance Film Festival 2009 and chaired of the juries of numerous festivals including the international film festival Vladivostok 2008, Ghent 2008 & Sevilla 2008.

She is on the board of European Film Bond, Filmstationen and the Danish Design Center. She is appointed a member of the School Council at the Danish Academy of Fine Arts by the Minister of Culture.

Awarded Chevalier de l’Ordre des Arts et des Lettres, France She won the Prix Eurimages award in the European Film Awards, 2008.

She has recently founded the production companies Windelov/Lassen Aps as well as Windelov/Lassen Interactive Aps together with producer Stinna Lassen.

In 2014 she founded Good Company Films with Stinna Lassen, Ole Sandberg and Anni Fernandez.

Selected filmography 

(films produced by Vibeke Windeløv)

References 

1950 births
20th-century Danish businesswomen
20th-century Danish businesspeople
21st-century Danish businesswomen
21st-century Danish businesspeople
Bodil Honorary Award recipients
Danish film producers
Danish theatre directors
Danish women company founders
Danish women film producers
European Film Awards winners (people)
Living people
People from Frederiksberg
Place of birth missing (living people)